Basiliscus was the only son of the East Roman military commander Armatus and briefly  of the East Roman Empire in 476–477/8. 
After the death of Eastern Roman Emperor Leo in 474, his grandson, Leo II took the throne, but died shortly thereafter, with his father Zeno taking power. Soon after taking power, Basiliscus' great-uncle, also named Basiliscus, took the throne from Zeno, forcing him into exile. Although Basiliscus was crowned in late 476, Zeno soon moved against Basiliscus' father, executing Armatus and exiling Basiliscus into the clergy as a lector at a church at Blachernae on the Golden Horn. In later life, he became a priest and finally bishop of Cyzicus. He may have survived into the reign of Justinian. He is involved in the narrative of Victor of Tunnuna, who suggests that Basiliscus is the same person as Leo II, whose death was faked by his mother Ariadne, although the historian Brian Croke does not accept this as true, considering this an attempt by Victor to explain the existence of a living Leo, as this was possibly the younger Basiliscus' regnal name.

Life
Armatus himself was the nephew of Eastern Roman Empress Verina and future Emperor Basiliscus.

Background
When Eastern Roman Emperor Leo fell ill in 473, he had his grandson, Leo II, the son of Zeno and Ariadne, crowned as emperor in October 473. Leo died on 18 January 474, and Leo II took the throne. Zeno was installed as co-emperor, crowned on 29 January, and when Leo II died in the autumn, Zeno became the sole eastern emperor. Zeno was very unpopular, among both the common people and the senatorial class, in part simply because he was an Isaurian, a race with a poor reputation, and partly because of fears he would promote Isuarians to high positions. Although Verina had supported Zeno's elevation as co-emperor, she turned against Zeno once he became sole emperor. Verina conspired to remove him as emperor, and historians generally accept that she planned to install her lover, the  Patricius, as emperor and to marry him. She was supported by the general Theoderic Strabo and her brother Basiliscus, who succeeded in recruiting Illus and Trocundes, as well as Armatus. The conspiracy was successful, as Zeno fled to Isauria on 9 January 475, either after learning of the conspiracy or after being convinced by Verina that his life was in danger. Verina's brother, Basiliscus, convinced the senate to acclaim him emperor, instead of Patricius. 

Emperor Basiliscus quickly lost support in Constantinople, due to heavy taxes, heretical ecclesiastical policies, and a natural disaster which was viewed as a sign of divine wrath against him. While Basiliscus's rise was not illegal, as usurpations confirmed by the senate were generally considered legitimate, such had not happened for over a century in the Eastern Roman Empire. Additionally, he was politically incompetent and temperamental, alienating much of his support. While Basiliscus was supported initially by the elites of the Eastern Roman Empire, he never gained much popularity amongst the common people, weakening his legitimacy; his conflicts with the Patriarch of Constantinople, Acacius reduced his support from the people of Constantinople, who were heavily Chalcedonian. Basiliscus was forced to levy heavy taxes by the near-bankruptcy of the empire, and also to sell off public positions for money. He utilized the  Epinicus, a former ally of Verina, to extort money from the church. Verina turned against Emperor Basiliscus after the execution of her lover and began to plot to return Zeno to power, and sought refuge in Blachernae. It is not known if she fled because of her support or began to support Zeno after she fled, as the source, Candidus, is unclear, but the  states that she remained there until after Emperor Basiliscus died. 

Emperor Basiliscus had Armatus made , allegedly at the insistence of his wife, Zenonis. This turned Theoderic Strabo against him, as he hated Armatus. Armatus was also made consul in 476, alongside Emperor Basiliscus himself. Illus and Trocundes, laying siege to Zeno in his native lands, defected to him. Illus, possibly buoyed by his hold over Zeno, by way of his imprisonment of his brother, arranged to ally him and they began to march towards Constantinople with their combined forces. Emperor Basiliscus ordered Armatus to take command of all the troops in Thrace and Constantinople, as well as the palace guard, and lead them against the three.

Caesarship

Basiliscus was likely traveling with his father Armatus, and thus on the path to Constantinople, Basiliscus was crowned  at the imperial palace of Nicaea, in late 476. The historian Brian Croke remarks that the coronation was "doubtless with all of the usual ritual and splendor." Zeno and Basiliscus then took a ship to Constantinople, while Armatus marched into Isaura. Zeno and Basiliscus entered Constantinople unopposed in August 476. The elder Basiliscus and his family fled and took refuge in a church, only leaving once Zeno promised not to execute them. Zeno exiled them to Limnae in Cappadocia, where they were imprisoned in a dried-up cistern and left to starve to death. According to some sources, they were instead beheaded. Zeno and Basiliscus then officiated games held at the Hippodrome of Constantinople and praised the victorious chariot-riders, which Croke called "a customary but vital gesture for reinforcing legitimacy". Given the unacceptable political associations of his name, it may have been changed to Leo, and he may be referred to as such on coins.

Croke comments that, after Zeno re-established himself in Constantinople, he began to consider the position of Armatus, and evaluated that his support was "extremely fragile". Armatus had, after all, pledged to serve the previous emperor, only to betray him when he sensed an opportunity for advancement. Taking decisive action, Zeno had Armatus killed, but spared the life of the young Basiliscus. Basiliscus was instead sent to become a lector at a church at Blachernae on the Golden Horn, Croke considers this a "safe and usual course of action", noting the recent precedents of Western Roman Emperors Avitus, sent to become bishop of Placentia, and Glycerius, who was made Bishop of Salona. He further notes that the young age of Basiliscus would not be an impediment, as it was not uncommon at the time for lectors to be young. The narrative of Basiliscus' employment as a lector is relayed solely by the contemporary historian Candidus Isaurus, whose work is preserved by Photius. Theophanes the Confessor, writing based upon a reliable source, which Croke remarks may be lost fragments of Malalas, explains that it was Zeno's wife Ariadne who interceded on Basiliscus' behalf as a result of their family ties, as she was cousin to Armatus. The length of Basiliscus tenure at Blachernae is unknown, but he later became the bishop of Cyzicus, and was reportedly very capable. Croke posits that this capability would mean that it was two or three decades after being deposed that Basiliscus came to be bishop, between the age of thirty and forty. After this point, little is known of Basiliscus; it is unknown when he died, or if he remained bishop at the time of his death, but he likely lived until the reign of Justinian. That he held the position of bishop later in his life is stated explicitly by Nikephoros Kallistos Xanthopoulos, drawing on now-lost contemporary sources. He may have retired to a church in Constantinople, possibly in Blachernae, after serving as bishop of Cyzicus.

Possible relationship with Leo II
The Chronicle of Victor of Tunnuna, which Croke considers "an otherwise relatively careful and accurate work" contains an entry that contradicts the accepted history of the death of Leo II, stating that Leo did not die in 474, but rather his mother Ariadne feared for his life and substituted him with a similar-looking boy. According to this narrative, Leo was hidden away in a local church, and lived until the reign of Justinian. Croke remarks that it is odd for the story to appear in a source of such quality, especially from a man who lived in a monastery in Constantinople itself during the reign of Justinian. He further remarks that the tale appears to be repeated throughout the capital's monasteries, and possibly streets, and therefore was spread to Victor directly, reliably enough that he believed it correct. Croke remarks that, if Basiliscus lived until the reign of Justinian, he would have been in his mid-fifties at the latest, and likely a figure that drew "local fame and attention", as a deposed emperor. In spite of this, his clerical role would have removed any threat he posed to Justinian. Croke comments that the coincidence between Basiliscus and the narrative surrounding Leo is "suspicious": Where Leo was a boy-emperor supposedly hidden away in a church in the capital, at the instigation of Ariadne, Basiliscus was a boy-emperor that was allowed to retire to a church by the intervention of Ariadne. Victor states that the allegedly surviving Leo was an ordained member of the regular church, rather than a mere monk, and, suggests that he only lived into the early reign of Justinian. As Croke notes, no other figure could have been the surviving Leo: no other emperors or rival claimants were alive by the rule of Justinian, let alone the smaller number of boy emperors. For these reasons, Croke concludes that there is no "worthwhile reason" to reject the information provided by Victor, and that, rather than complicate the matter by requiring Basiliscus to also be called Leo, would if true, "provide the most satisfactory solution thus far to a notorious riddle of late Roman numismatics". 

Yet  and  dated to the precise period after the reign of Basiliscus bear the image of Emperor Zeno and a  Leo. For these reasons, the numismatist John Kent states "Clearly, Zeno and Leo...were either contemporary with, or immediately followed, the reign of Basiliscus and Marcus". With no extant coins dating to the joint rule of emperor Zeno and  Basiliscus, some have dated the outlying coins to this period, such as the early numismatist Nicolas Damas Marchant, which has been accepted by the Byzantinist Ernst Stein, and implicitly so by the authors of the Prosopography of the Later Roman Empire. He argues the possibility that the coins represent complementary coins, rather than subsequent ones, and admits that no "documentary evidence" exists, but posits that Zeno and Leo are both likely names for Basiliscus' sons, given that he was husband to Zenonis and brother to Leo I's widow. Croke argues that Kent's reluctance to affirmatively state that Zeno and Leo represent sons of Basiliscus is understandable, given the lack of literary evidence, and lack of evidence that any of his other children were even male, aside from the oddity of the dies of Basiliscus and Marcus being struck out if they are meant to be complimentary coins. Therefore, Croke considers Kent's theory to be "at best, inconclusive." 

Croke offers a potentially more reasonable explanation, that Victor, or the tradition he was following, was put into a position where he had to explain the presence of a former boy-emperor named Leo in the face of the natural death of Leo, and thus was forced to use the first to explain the second. It is, therefore, possible, Croke argues, that Eastern Roman popular opinion, having forgotten about the brief reign of the younger Basiliscus, also known as Leo, invented a story that Leo II survived, to explain the existence of the former boy emperor. Croke states that Victor would understandably doubt the established facts surrounding Leo II, and explained the situation as best he could. He concludes that the narrative does not represent a willful invention, but rather the best efforts of a chronicler; and that the narrative might serve at least to confirm that the younger Basiliscus reigned under the name of Leo and lived into the reign of Justinian.

Sources

Notes

Citations

Bibliography

 
 
 
 
 
 
 
 
 
 

5th-century births
6th-century deaths
5th-century Byzantine bishops
Caesars (heirs apparent)
Heirs apparent who never acceded
6th-century Byzantine bishops
Bishops of Cyzicus